Frederick John "Fred" Alsop (born 20 October 1938 in Plaistow, Essex) is a British former triple jumper and long jumper.

Athletics career
He competed in the 1960 Summer Olympics, in the 1964 Summer Olympics, and in the 1968 Summer Olympics. His best result was his fourth place in the triple jump at the 1964 Tokyo Olympics.

He represented England and won a bronze medal in the triple jump at the 1962 British Empire and Commonwealth Games in Perth, Western Australia. He repeated the achievement fours years later by winning another bronze at the 1966 British Empire and Commonwealth Games in Kingston, Jamaica.

References

1938 births
Living people
Olympic athletes of Great Britain
Athletes (track and field) at the 1960 Summer Olympics
Athletes (track and field) at the 1964 Summer Olympics
Athletes (track and field) at the 1968 Summer Olympics
English male long jumpers
Athletes (track and field) at the 1962 British Empire and Commonwealth Games
Athletes (track and field) at the 1966 British Empire and Commonwealth Games
Commonwealth Games bronze medallists for England
People from Plaistow, Newham
Athletes from London
Commonwealth Games medallists in athletics
Medallists at the 1962 British Empire and Commonwealth Games
Medallists at the 1966 British Empire and Commonwealth Games